The Communauté de communes Plaines et Monts de France is a communauté de communes in the Seine-et-Marne département and in the Île-de-France région of France. It was formed on 1 June 2013 by the merger of the former Communauté de communes du Pays de la Goële et du Multien, Communauté de communes de la Plaine de France, Communauté de communes des Portes de la Brie and 4 other communes. It lost 17 communes on 1 January 2016 to the newly created Communauté d'agglomération Roissy Pays de France. Its seat is in Dammartin-en-Goële, which is not part of the communauté de communes anymore. Its area is 144.7 km2, and its population was 25,067 in 2019.

Composition
Since 2016, it consists of 20 communes:

Annet-sur-Marne
Charmentray
Charny
Cuisy
Fresnes-sur-Marne
Iverny
Marchémoret
Messy
Montgé-en-Goële
Nantouillet
Oissery
Le Pin
Le Plessis-aux-Bois
Le Plessis-l'Évêque
Précy-sur-Marne
Saint-Mesmes
Saint-Pathus
Villeroy
Villevaudé
Vinantes

References 

Plaines et Monts de France
Plaines et Monts de France